Hitman: Blood Money is a 2006 stealth video game developed by IO Interactive and published by Eidos Interactive. It was released in May 2006 for Microsoft Windows, PlayStation 2, Xbox and Xbox 360. It is the fourth installment in the Hitman video game series, and the sequel to 2004's Hitman: Contracts. The story follows cloned assassin Agent 47's efforts to bring down the Franchise, a rival contract killing organization that is threatening his employers, the International Contract Agency (ICA), and seeking to obtain the same cloning technology that created 47. Meanwhile, a frame story presents 47's life and various contracts he carried out, as narrated by a former FBI director to a journalist.

Blood Money was a critical and commercial success, selling more than 2.1 million copies. It has gained a cult following and is considered by many publications and critics as one of the greatest video games ever made. High-definition ports of Blood Money and two of its predecessors, Hitman 2: Silent Assassin and Contracts, were released on PlayStation 3 and Xbox 360 in January 2013 as the Hitman HD Trilogy. A sequel, Hitman: Absolution, was released in 2012, and 4K remastered ports of both Blood Money and Absolution were released by Warner Bros. Interactive Entertainment in 2019 on the PlayStation 4 and Xbox One as part of the Hitman HD Enhanced Collection.

Gameplay

As with previous installments, Hitman: Blood Money has the player control series protagonist Agent 47, who is assigned various targets to assassinate in order to complete missions. Armed guards, security checkpoints, witnesses and other obstacles attempt to prohibit Agent 47's success. The player guides Agent 47 through the game's levels from a third-person perspective. A map showing each topographical area and the location of targets and characters assists the player. To complete his mission, Agent 47 uses multiple methods to eliminate targets, regardless of witnesses or violence to bystanders. Blood Money penalizes players for making too much noise or being too violent.

New features introduced in Blood Money included the ability to climb over obstacles, improved unarmed combat, the use of non-player characters (NPC) as shields, the ability to dispose of bodies, improved character animations, a new game engine, and the ability to upgrade weapons and equipment. Seven of the featured weapons in the game, and some pieces of equipment, can be upgraded.

Every level in Blood Money contains a method to make the target's death look like an accident, such as tampering with a grill to make it explode when it is turned on, rigging a chandelier to fall on a target or pushing a target off a balcony. Agent 47 can improvise weapons to complete missions, such as nail guns, toy air rifles, knives, screwdrivers, stilettos, cane swords, fire extinguishers, hammers, and hedge clippers.

Blood Money introduced a notoriety system that rises and falls based upon Agent 47's success. The higher Agent 47's notoriety, the easier it is for NPCs to identify him. If Agent 47 is captured on camera surveillance or witnessed committing murder, the character's notoriety will rise. If the player executes a mission perfectly, Agent 47's notoriety will be minimal. Blood Money provides players with methods to reduce Agent 47's notoriety, including destroying surveillance equipment and bribery. Notoriety gained in early missions will affect later missions. The player receives payment upon completion of a mission, which can be used to upgrade weapons, or bribe authorities to lower your notoriety score. The amount of money the player receives depends on how cleanly the assassination is carried out, with silent killings with no witnesses receiving the highest payout.

Upon completion of each mission, a newspaper article is displayed containing the mission's results, Agent 47's notoriety level, the weapon most frequently used and how accurately it was used, the number of police, security, and civilians killed or injured, and the existence of witnesses. Sketches of Agent 47's face are displayed and become more accurate as the character's notoriety grows. Players are awarded ratings based upon the success of the mission, such as a designation of "silent assassin" when the target was assassinated as cleanly and quietly as possible.

Blood Money improved the melee weapons system from previous releases, allowing players to lethally throw weapons at NPCs. Unlike previous games, melee weapons cannot be transferred to the player's inventory. Blood Money also introduces rival assassins.

Plot
American journalist Rick Henderson visits the estate of former FBI Director Alexander Leland "Jack" Cayne, in hopes of interviewing him over an attack at the White House or his career. However, Cayne reveals that the interview was merely a ruse, and that Rick was invited to be given the details concerning a far greater story - the full details on cloned hitman Agent 47, a contract killer for the International Contract Agency (ICA), a global organisation involved in assassinations. Although sceptical over the existence of 47, who is deemed an urban myth, Rick decides to listen to Cayne's story, reading documents he provides about a number of contracts committed by 47.

The documents reveal that after 47 had committed an assassination against a bankrupt amusement park owner in Baltimore, Maryland, he went abroad to conduct jobs in Chile and France, assigned to him by his handler Diana Burnwood, before taking on several across the United States. During this time, the ICA found itself being targeted by a rival outfit called "the Franchise", who soon began killing ICA agents while hunting down 47. Although 47 avoids being killed by rival assassins, Diana is forced to shut down the ICA, and divides up its remaining resources between him and herself. Cayne eventually goes on to talk about the White House attack, claiming 47 was involved in the chaos that occurred, but was ultimately brought down by his handler as the law closed in on him.

Unknown to Cayne, 47 had been made aware that the Franchise was working for a political organization that sought to monopolize on Ort-Meyer's cloning technology. As the current US President was planning to legalize cloning, the Franchise was hired to assassinate him so that their puppet, the U.S. Vice President, would replace them. 47 found himself hired by a CIA agent, whom he rescued in a previous contract, to prevent this. With the Franchise exposed, Diana decided to bring down the outfit with a risky plan by pretending to double-cross 47 and injecting him with poison - in reality a serum to induce a hibernatory state that mimics death, so that he could be brought close to those involved in the Franchise.

As 47's bone marrow could be used by the organization's rivals, Cayne, the head of the Franchise, was ordered to find him and kill him. To ensure his marrow cannot be recovered, Cayne had him prepared for cremation, and brings Rick to watch the ceremony. However, Diana takes an opportunity in the ceremony to give 47 the antidote to the serum, allowing him to wake and kill everyone present. With his anonymity preserved, Diana steals the Franchise's assets to reopen the ICA, while 47 proceeds to take on his next contract.

Development
Hitman: Blood Money was announced in November 2004, with a scheduled release for spring 2005. However, the date was later delayed into 2006. In March 2006, it was revealed that the game would be released on the Xbox 360, making it the first Hitman game to be released on the seventh generation of video game consoles. Blood Money was released on the PlayStation 2, Xbox, Xbox 360 and Microsoft Windows on 26 May 2006 in Europe and PAL territories, and 30 May in North America. The game, along with its predecessors, was made available on Steam in March 2007. On 29 January 2013, Blood Money was included in the Hitman HD Trilogy, a compilation also including Hitman 2: Silent Assassin and Hitman: Contracts, released for the PlayStation 3 and Xbox 360. In March 2018, the Xbox 360 version of the game was made backwards compatible for the Xbox One. Blood Money was also included in another compilation, the Hitman HD Enhanced Collection, with Hitman: Absolution, which was released on the PlayStation 4 and Xbox One in January 2019. This version of the game was remastered with updated visuals and could be played in 4K resolution.

Soundtrack

The Hitman: Blood Money Original Soundtrack, composed by Jesper Kyd, was released on 30 May 2006 by Sumthing Else and Eidos. The score was performed with the Budapest Symphony Orchestra and the Hungarian Radio Choir. It features Kyd's trademark ambience and dark, foreboding arrangements with the choral parts in deep brooding Latin.

The soundtrack was nominated for the Best Video Game Score at the 2006 MTV Video Music Awards, losing to The Elder Scrolls IV: Oblivion. It received the "Xbox Game of the Year-Best Original Score" award from IGN.

Additional music includes a rendition of Franz Schubert's "Ave Maria" sung by Daniel Perret of the Zurich Boys' Choir, a rendition of "Tomorrow Never Dies" by Swan Lee, "White Noise" by The Vacation, "Slasher" by Institute For The Criminally Insane, and a Bach's Cello Suite No. 1 in G Major.

Controversy
Several advertisements promoting Blood Money generated controversy for their violent imagery. The ad that drew the most attention depicted a woman lying on a bed in lingerie, seemingly asleep but with a bullet hole in her forehead. The caption above the picture read,  "Beautifully Executed..." Other ads were "Classically Executed" which featured a cellist who has been executed with a garrote, "Coldly Executed" which showed a body in a freezer, and "Shockingly Executed" which depicted a woman electrocuted in a bath by a toaster. These advertisements were criticized for promoting murder, with one commentator saying they were in "extremely poor taste".

Reception

Hitman: Blood Money received "generally positive" reviews across all platforms, according to review aggregator Metacritic.

GameSpot reported that diverse imaginative scenarios gave Blood Money its share of violent thrills. GameSpy praised the expanded scope and options in each level, such as making kills appear as accidents, saying the game provided enough choices to encourage players to play missions multiple times," but criticized the notoriety system as "underutilized."

IGN praised Blood Moneys "impressive orchestral compositions." GameTrailers wrote that the soundtrack "drives your emotions" through the missions."

In contrary to this praise, TeamXbox criticized Blood Money for offering no innovations from its predecessor Hitman: Contracts.

Hitman: Blood Money sold more than 1.5 million copies by July 17, 2006. By 2011, it had sold more than 2.1 million copies.

See also
 List of video games considered the best

References

External links
 Official website
 

2006 video games
Christmas video games
Eidos Interactive games
Fiction with unreliable narrators
Hitman (franchise)
Obscenity controversies in video games
PlayStation 2 games
Stealth video games
Interquel video games
United States presidential succession in fiction
Video game sequels
Video games scored by Jesper Kyd
Video games developed in Denmark
Video games set in amusement parks
Video games set in Baltimore
Video games set in California
Video games set in Chile
Video games set in Colorado
Video games set in the Las Vegas Valley
Video games set in New Orleans
Video games set in Mississippi
Video games set in Nevada
Video games set in Paris
Video games set in San Diego
Video games set in Washington, D.C.
Windows games
Xbox games
Xbox 360 games
Video games set in 2004
Video games set in 2005
Works about witness protection
Single-player video games